Cozart-Coley House is a historic Victorian house located in downtown Stem, North Carolina. The house was constructed in 1901 by Sheriff Cozart of Stem and later owned by a local business owner and member of the Coley family. The house is 3,826 square feet, two stories and has four bedrooms and three bathrooms, a fruit cellar, and servants quarters. It sits on 1.5 acres.

References 

Houses in Granville County, North Carolina
Victorian architecture in North Carolina